Monique Rolland (17 December 1913 – 27 September 1999) was a French film actress. She appeared in the 1932 film Narcotics.

Selected filmography
 Narcotics (1932)
 The Barber of Seville (1933)
 Paris-Deauville (1934)
 The Midnight Prince (1934)
 A Rare Bird (1936)
 A Hen on a Wall (1936)
 The Alibi (1937)
 The West (1938)
 Paradise Lost (1940)
 Foolish Husbands (1941)

References

Bibliography
 Youngkin, Stephen. The Lost One: A Life of Peter Lorre. University Press of Kentucky, 2005.

External links

1913 births
1999 deaths
French film actresses
Actresses from Paris
20th-century French actresses